This is a list of rail accidents which occurred between 2010 and 2019.

2010 

Ten people, including the driver of one of the trains, are injured. At least 10 people were reported to have been killed.

 3 January – Turkey – Two trains collide between Bayirkoy and Vezirhan. One person is killed and three are injured.

 4 January
 Finland – 2010 Helsinki Central Station accident: A passenger train suffers a brake failure and crashes into a hotel at  station.
 United Kingdom – A freight train from Inverness to Grangemouth derails at Carrbridge railway station and runs down an embankment due to an accumulation of snow and ice in critical parts of the train's brake mechanism.
 12 February – United States – At 10:13, a train derails in the pocket track just north of Farragut North Washington Metro station when the front car leaves the tracks. Of the nearly 400 passengers on board, one person was taken to hospital. The NTSB concluded that the train operator (driver) was at fault for rule violations, including continuing past a red signal without authorization. Contributing factors were poor supervision of the operator which prevented correct configuration of the train for the signal and control system. There were also difficulties with the radio systems.
 15 February – Belgium – Halle train collision: Two passenger trains collide laterally in Buizingen near Brussels. 19 people were killed and 171 were injured.
 25 February – Canada – A Via Rail train 15 travelling from Halifax to Montreal derails near Saint-Charles-de-Bellechasse outside Quebec City, injuring four people and causing significant damage to nearby homes.
 15 March – United States – A METRO bus collides with a light rail METRO train in Houston, Texas, injuring nearly 20 people.
Three people die and four are seriously injured.
 1 April – Slovakia – A locomotive runs into a stationary passenger train after its brakes fail during a test ride in Spišská Nová Ves, Slovakia, killing three people and seriously injuring eight.

 12 April – Italy – Merano derailment: A passenger train is hit by a landslide and partially derails near Merano, South Tyrol, killing 9 and injuring 28.
 21 April – South Africa – 2010 Pretoria train accident: The coaches of a luxury tourist train operated by Rovos Rail run away and derail at Pretoria during a locomotive changeover. Three crew members died in the incident: two died at the scene while the third, a woman four months pregnant, died in the hospital. The accident left 9 passengers injured, six of them critically.
 12 May - United States - A BNSF Railway freight train hits a rockslide and derails in the Wind River Canyon near Thermopolis, Wyoming.
 13 May – United States – A northbound Amtrak Piedmont collides with a truck towing a low loader in Mebane, North Carolina. 11 are injured. The reports from the railroads involved collected by the Federal Railroad Administration indicate that there were 17 injuries and $3.3 million of damage. The accident was caused by the truck driver.
 23 May – China – 2010 Jiangxi derailment: A passenger train derails, killing 19 people and injuring 71, after being knocked off the tracks by a landslide in a mountainous area of Jiangxi province.
 25 May – India – A passenger train derails at Naugachia, injuring eleven people.
 28 May – India – Jnaneswari Express train derailment - A train derails in the West Midnapore district of West Bengal, caused by either sabotage or a bomb that damaged the railway track, and was struck by an on-coming goods train, resulting in 148 passenger deaths.
 4 June – India – A minibus is hit by the Coimbatore–Mettupalayam special train at an unmanned level-crossing at Idigarai near Coimbatore. Five people were killed in the accident.
 6 June – United Kingdom – Falls of Cruachan derailment - A First ScotRail passenger train collides with boulders that had fallen on the line near , derails and catches fire. Several people were hospitalised and the line was blocked for a week.
 16 June – Germany – A passenger train collides with a derailed freight train at Peine. Sixteen people are injured.
 18 June – India – Eight coaches and two engines of the Vasco-Howrah Amaravati Express (8048) derail near Koppal in Karnataka, after the train had struck a road roller at an unmanned level-crossing. Six people, including the drivers of the road roller and the train, are injured.
 20 June – South Africa – A steam-hauled passenger train from Pretoria to Cullinan derails near Cullinan due to defective track. A number of sleepers had been stolen. 15F 4-8-2 No 3117 was severely damaged as it ended up lying on its side.
At least 76 people died, and others were injured.
 23 June – Spain – Castelldefels train accident - 12 people die and 14 are injured when they are struck by an Alaris while crossing the railway tracks at Castelldefels Playa station.
 28 June – Czech Republic – Ústí nad Labem derailment: A CityElefant passenger train from Prague to Ústí nad Labem derails while entering the Ústí nad Labem station, killing the driver and injuring 11 passengers. The cause of the derailment is unknown; the train's  speed exceeded the local  speed limit and may have been a factor.
 13 July – Poland – Two trains collide at Korzybie, injuring 36.
 19 July – India – Sainthia train collision: At least 63 people die and over 150 are injured when the Uttar Banga Express is involved in a rear-end collision with the stationary Vananchal Express at Sainthia railway station, Sainthia.

 21 July - United States - Miami, Florida: 2 Metromover Trains collided at 12th Street Train Station. There are 40 people on each train, 16 people were injured.
 23 July – Switzerland – Fiesch derailment: One person is killed and 42 are injured when an eastbound Glacier Express derails near Fiesch on the Matterhorn Gotthard Bahn.
 25 July – Netherlands – The driver and a second rail worker are injured when a Speno railgrinder fails to stop in front of the buffer stop at Stavoren. A shop lying behind the track is demolished.
 6 August – Italy – Circumvesuviana derailment: One person dies and about 40 are injured in a train derailment in Naples, on the Circumvesuviana railway.
 6 August – Israel – A passenger train strikes a minibus near Kiryat Gat; seven people die and 20 are injured.
 17 August – United Kingdom – Little Cornard derailment: A sewage tanker lorry strikes and derails a passenger train (the 17.31 National Express East Anglia service from Sudbury to Marks Tey) on a level crossing at Little Cornard, Suffolk. Eighteen people are injured, two of them seriously.
 17 August – Germany – The Intercity-Express from Frankfurt to Paris hits a truck that had slid onto the railway near Lambrecht. The first two carriages derail and ten people are injured, one seriously.
 17 August – India – Four people die in a train accident on the Faizabad-Lucknow rail-section at Goryamau railway station of Barabanki district located between the towns of Rudauli and Rozagaon.
 25 August – South Africa – Blackheath train accident: A Metrorail commuter train strikes a minibus taxi carrying children to school. Ten are killed and five injured. Witnesses state that the minibus drove around closed booms; the driver was charged with culpable homicide. On 12 December 2011, the taxi driver was convicted in the Western Cape High Court on ten counts of murder and four counts of attempted murder and on 28 February 2012, the judge sentenced him to an effective 20 years imprisonment.
 10 September – United States – A conductor loses his arm when two Union Pacific freight trains collide in Fontana, California.
 12 September – Sweden – A woman dies, two people are seriously injured and 15 more are brought to hospital with minor injuries, when an X 2000 high-speed train collides with a backhoe loader at Kimstad near Linköping.
 15 September – Belgium – Two trains collide at Aarlen, injuring 30–40 people, two seriously.
 24 September – Tunisia – Bir el-Bey train collision: Two trains collide at Bir El Bay, killing one and injuring 57.
 30 September – New Zealand – A Wellington commuter EMU derails after striking a landslip and is struck less than a minute later by a sister unit travelling on the opposite line. Two people are hospitalised and others suffer light injuries. The drivers of the two units were father and son. The TAIC investigation found that no special track inspections were made and no speed restrictions were put in place despite rainfall well above average and a site at high risk of landslide.

 1 October – Norway – Skotterud derailment: 40 people are injured when a train derails at Skotterud.
 2 October – Indonesia – Petarukan train collision: 36 people are killed and 60 are injured when a train runs into the back of another at Petarukan.
 2 October – Indonesia – A train crashes at Solo, Central Java, killing one person.
 12 October – Ukraine – Marhanets train accident: At least 43 people are killed in a collision between a train and a bus at Marhanets, Dnipropetrovsk Oblast.

The driver of the lorry is seriously injured.
 8 December – Bangladesh – Two passenger trains are in a head-on collision near Narsingdi. Nineteen people are killed.
 23 December – Estonia – One person is killed and two are injured when a drunk former train driver takes control without permission of an empty passenger train and drives it in a head-on collision with a freight train near Aegviidu.
 28 December – United Kingdom – A passenger train runs into a large amount of ice in Summit Tunnel, Todmorden, West Yorkshire and derails.

2011

 1 January – Argentina – Two passenger trains collide in Buenos Aires, injuring forty-five people.
 11 January – Netherlands – An ICE express train collides with a freight train and is derailed at Zevenaar. There are no injuries.
 29 January – Germany – Hordorf train collision: A freight train and a passenger train collide near Hordorf in Saxony-Anhalt on the Magdeburg–Thale line. The passenger train derails. Ten people die and twenty-three people are injured.
One passenger was taken to hospital.
 17 February – Argentina – A train runs into the back of another near San Miguel rail station,  from Buenos Aires. Four passengers die, one hundred and twenty are injured. Federal Judge Juan Manuel Yalj, in charge of the investigation, said that two of the four brakes from the Ferrobaires train's engine were unusable because "one was blocked and the other had been locked and nailed down."

 13 March – United States – 2011 California BART train derailment: Two cars of a ten-car BART train derail in Northern California. Three minor back injuries are reported.
 19 March – United States – In Spartanburg, South Carolina's Cleveland Park, one out of the 2 miniature trains in the park, the red and silver F-series locomotive, carrying children derailed, killing 1 young boy and injuring 28 people in total. Reports say that the train was speeding over the limit prior to the derailment. The inspector of the park was later fired.
 23 March – Germany – A passenger train collides with a lorry on a level crossing near Gronau. Fourteen passengers are injured.
 27 March – Canada – About 20 cars of a 116-car train derailed Sunday afternoon near Port Hope en route to Toronto. Families in twenty houses flee and a major passenger rail corridor is shut down. One empty derailed car catches fire and burns for about an hour.
 28 March – United States – A CSX train travelling through Newton Falls, Ohio with an estimated 100 cars of mixed freight (including hoppers and tankers), suffers a 12-car derailment at approximately 07.00 (local time) Eastern Daylight Time. Three rail cars fall off a bridge and onto Center Street.  Several of the tank cars are carrying chlorine; none are involved in the derailment. Initial reports indicate that at least one car may have leaked ammonia, but officials do not believe that any hazardous materials have escaped into the environment. Residents within 150 metres of the incident are evacuated, and most roads leading into town are closed by law enforcement officers. Local HAZMAT officials arrive to assess the scene, and the United States Federal Bureau of Investigation opens an inquiry into the incident 'as a matter of standard procedure'.

 7 April – Israel – Two trains collide near Netanya, injuring 60 people.
 27 April – Taiwan – Six people are killed and 61 injured in Alishan when a falling tree strikes a train carrying mostly tourists from mainland China.
 28 April – Poland – A train derails after hitting a lorry in Mosty, Pomeranian Voivodeship, killing two and injuring at least twenty people.
 8 May – United States – A PATH train collides with the spring bumper at Hoboken Terminal, New Jersey, injuring 34 people.
 20 May – South Africa – 857 people are injured, 25 seriously, when a rear-end collision occurs at Soweto.
 24 May – United States – In Mineral Springs, South Carolina, A CSX train collided onto another Union Pacific train, 2 people were killed.
 27 May – Japan – The limited-express train Super Ozora No. 14, en route from Kushiro to Sapporo in Hokkaido, catches fire in a tunnel on the Sekisho Line after the second car of the six-car formation derails. None of the 245 passengers and crew are killed, but 39 are treated for smoke inhalation or minor burn injuries, and the train is a total loss. It is the first in a series of incidents over the summer that lead to harsh criticism of JR Hokkaido's safety procedures, as well as the apparent suicide of the company president.
 3 June – United States – A Metra commuter train from Aurora, Illinois and an Amtrak train heading to Carbondale, Illinois collide at Chicago's Union Station at about 08.15, injuring at least five people. One of the trains derails.
 16 June – Norway – 2011 Hallingskeid Station fire – A fire started in the snow tunnel at Hallingskeid Station. It was caused by sparks from welding.
 24 June – United States – Miriam (near Reno), Nevada: Despite the working signals on the track, a semi, driving on a rural stretch of U.S. Route 95 near Reno and Sparks, strikes one of the cars of a westbound California Zephyr Amtrak passenger train, killing at least six people, according to Nevada Highway Patrol Trooper Dan Lopez and the Churchill County Sheriff's Office (the driver of the semi, whose reason or motivation remains unclear at this time, and an Amtrak conductor on board the train are two confirmed deaths so far).
 7 July – India – A Mathura Chhapra Express train rams into a bus carrying wedding guests around 02.00 at an unmanned railway crossing in Thanagaon, Kanshiram Nagar district, Uttar Pradesh, killing 38 and injuring thirty.
 10 July – India – Fatehpur derailment – The Kalka Mail train running from Howrah to Delhi derails near the town of Fatehpur in Uttar Pradesh, killing seventy people and injuring more than three hundred.
 10 July – India – The engine along with four coaches of the Guwahati Puri Express derails between Rangiya and Ghagrapar, Nalbari district, Assam and capsizes in a rivulet, injuring more than one hundred people, twenty critically.
 11 July – United States – An Amtrak Downeaster passenger train from Boston, Massachusetts heading to Portland, Maine is struck by a garbage truck at a crossing in North Berwick, Maine, killing the driver of the truck and setting the locomotive and one passenger car on fire.
 23 July – China – Wenzhou train collision – Due to signal failure, a high-speed train rear-ends a stopped high-speed train at a speed of  near Wenzhou in the province of Zhejiang, killing forty people and injuring at least 192. Six carriages derail, four carriages fall off a viaduct.
 26 July – Germany – A locomotive caught on fire within the Berlin Ostbahnhof around 15:40 CET. Traffic was interrupted for a few hours while the fire was fought down. There were no casualties, but the locomotive was destroyed and the coach coupled to it was damaged.
 26 July – Poland – Seven goods wagons roll uncontrolled  and then derail and crash into a Strzelce Krajenskie Wschód railway station building. Three people die.
 31 July – India – The engine and some coaches of the Guwahati Bangalore Express derail and are hit by another train in Malda district, West Bengal. At least three people are killed and two hundred are injured.
 8 August – Switzerland – A passenger train and locomotive collide at Döttingen. Twenty-two people are injured. The passenger train had passed a signal at danger.
 12 August – Poland – 2011 Baby derailment: A passenger train with 280 passengers derails due to high speed at Baby, Piotrków County, killing one passenger and injuring 84.
Five members of the train crew are killed.
 13 September – India – A passenger train fails to slow at a signal and slams into a stationary cargo train near Chennai, Tamil Nadu, killing ten and injuring fifty-two.
 13 September – Argentina – 2011 Flores rail crash – In the Flores barrio of Buenos Aires, a bus crashes into a train, which derails and collides with a second train, killing eleven and injuring 228, twenty severely. Lights were flashing but the crossing barriers may have been blocked from fully lowering.
 15 September – Argentina – A collision in Buenos Aires between a bus, a concrete mixer and a light-rail train injures 90 people during morning rush-hour traffic.

 6 October – Switzerland – Two trains collide at Olten. Two people are injured.
No injuries are reported; 800 people are evacuated.
 12 October – United States – In Oakland, California a southbound Amtrak San Joaquin train passes a red signal and collides with a stopped Coast Starlight train at low speed, injuring seventeen people.
 31 October – Malaysia – A Sabah State Railway train carrying 200 passengers collides with a petrol tanker in Kota Kinabalu resulting in an explosion injuring twelve passengers.
 1 November – Moldova – A bus collided with a train in Anenii Noi, killing eight people and leaving a dozen injured, all the casualties were on the bus.
 2 November – Argentina – A freight train collides with a school bus in a rural area of San Luis Province, eight girls are killed and 41 are injured.
 22 November – India – A fire on board a Doon Express train in Jharkhand destroys two coaches, killing seven people including one Australian woman.
Three passengers are injured.
 27 December – Australia – Flood waters from Tropical Cyclone Grant wash away the southern abutment of the Edith River bridge, derailing a northbound Genesee & Wyoming Australia intermodal freight train on its way to Darwin near Katherine, south of Darwin, injuring one crew member. A crew van and five wagons fall into the river.

2012 
 6 January – United States – Three CSX freight trains collide in a remote section of Porter County, Indiana in the city of Westville at approximately 1:18 PM central, resulting in a fire and possible HAZMAT situation. Many stack cars were derailed as well. Only two injuries were reported. The NTSB report placed the blame on the second train which failed to obey signals, causing it to run into the first train. The third train ran into the derailed trains shortly thereafter.
 11 January – India – Five persons were killed and nine others injured in a collision between the Delhi-bound Brahmaputra Mail and a stationary goods train.
 13 January – Germany – A passenger train of Nord-Ostsee-Bahn collides with a herd of cattle on the track from Sylt island to Hamburg, near Bargum, Nordfriesland. One passenger dies and three are injured.
 17 January – United States – A BNSF Railway freight train collides with a tractor trailer in northeast Montana, causing ten rail cars to derail, including four locomotives and blocking the traffic on the rail line.
 19 January – Spain – A commuter train collides with an empty train at Barcelona Clot Aragó station after the first train failed to obey a restriction signal. Six people are injured.
 1 February – United States – The Amtrak Wolverine train from Pontiac, Michigan to Chicago, carrying 71 passengers and 5 crew, strikes a stalled tractor trailer (carrying equipment for oil production) on tracks in Leoni Township, Michigan. The lead engine and at least two cars derail. There are no fatalities, and six people suffer non-life-threatening injuries, according to the Jackson Citizen Patriot and the Blackman-Leoni Public Safety Department.
 3 February – India – A passenger train derails after striking a construction vehicle in the Indian state of Assam, killing three people and injuring fifty.
The driver is seriously injured and ten passengers are injured.

 15 February – Norway – A brand-new passenger train derails near  after going far too fast on the Vestfold Line, because of driver error. Five crew members are injured. There are no passengers on board. There is no automatic surveillance of most curve speed limits on this line.

 22 February – Argentina – 2012 Buenos Aires rail disaster: A train crashes into a buffer stop at a station in Buenos Aires. 51 people die and more than 700 are injured.
 26 February – Canada – 2012 Burlington Via derailment: A Via Rail train derails near Burlington, Ontario. Three engineers die, and dozens are injured.

 3 March – Poland – Szczekociny rail crash: Two passenger trains collide head-on near Szczekociny. There are 16 fatalities and 58 injured.
 6 March – Ireland – A number of detonators explode in the driver's kit in the train cab of a DART train, injuring the train driver's hands and possibly his hearing. Train drivers carry 10 detonators for safety reasons; they are placed on tracks if there has been an accident or engineering works to notify other train drivers. These should only explode with the force of a train going over them. They are replaced every five years and the ones in question had been replaced just over a year before. Irish Rail have withdrawn all detonators that were replaced January 2011 as a precaution. The train was taken out of service as there was damage to the train cab.
 26 March – India – A locomotive pilot of a Mainline Electric Multiple Unit (MEMU) train and a truck driver were killed when the speeding passenger train rammed into a boulder-ferrying truck at the Kannamangala gate on the outskirts of Bangalore.
 13 April – Germany – A regional train on its way from Frankfurt to Hanau collides with a railway maintenance vehicle (a combined excavator and crane as a road-rail vehicle) on the same track near Offenbach. The train's driver and two construction workers die, 12 train passengers and a conductor sustain injuries. The investigation finds that the excavator had been deployed onto the live track, not the one reserved for construction work.

 21 April – Netherlands – Amsterdam Westerpark train collision: Two trains are involved in a head-on collision between Amsterdam Centraal and Amsterdam Sloterdijk stations; one person dies, at least 117 people are injured.
 10 May – Romania – More than 92 people are injured in a crash involving three trams in western Bucharest.
 13 May - United States - At Miami Airport, a Mia Mover Train derailed, 2 people were injured.
 22 May – India – Penukonda train collision: The Bangalore-bound Hampi Express crashed into a stationary freight train near Penukonda in Andhra Pradesh. The incident killed twenty-five people while 43 people were said to be injured.
 31 May – India – Mahrawa derailment: Four people die and over fifty are injured in the Mahrawa derailment of the Doon express in Uttar Pradesh.
 12 June – Germany – A tram ran full speed into two waiting trams at a tramstop in Essen. The operator of the tram was unable to stop within time to avoid a collision. 28 people are injured.
 24 June – United States – Three crew members were killed when two Union Pacific trains slammed into each other just east of Goodwell, about 480 kilometres northwest of Oklahoma City. The crash triggered a diesel-fueled fireball that appeared to weld the locomotives together.
 4 July – United States – A Union Pacific Railroad coal train heading to Wisconsin derails, collapsing an overpass on Shermer Road in Glenview, Illinois at about 13.45. A day later, a couple, having been crushed by the falling coal and cars, are found dead in their car buried beneath the rubble.
 11 July – United States – A Norfolk Southern train with 2 locomotives and 98 cars derails in Columbus, Ohio, near the Ohio State Fairgrounds at 02.05 CDT. At the time of the explosion, two nearby individuals are injured; they drive themselves to hospital.
 12 July – United Kingdom – An Arriva Trains Wales passenger train collides with cattle on the line at Letterston, Pembrokeshire and is derailed. There are no injuries amongst those on board.
 13 July – South Africa – Hectorspruit level crossing accident: A goods train hauling coal from Witbank to Maputo smashes into a truck carrying 44 farm workers at a controlled level crossing near Hectorspruit, Mpumalanga, killing 26 people.
 17 July – Egypt – A passenger train strikes wooden planks and chunks of metal put down by people to cross the tracks and derails at Giza, near Cairo, injuring fifteen passengers.
 19 July – India – One person was killed, four were injured seriously, and nine sustained minor injuries in a collision between a local train and Vidarbha Express near Khardi station near Nashik on Mumbai-Kasara route.
 21 July – United States – A Kansas City Southern freight train collides with a BNSF coal train and derails in Barton County, Missouri, injuring two railway workers.
 24 July, 29 September and 10 October – Germany – 2012 Stuttgart derailments: Three InterCities derailed in Stuttgart at the same place and for the same reasons.
 30 July – India – Nellore train fire: 32 passengers die and 27 are injured in the early morning Nellore train fire on the Delhi-Chennai Tamil Nadu Express near Nellore, Andhra Pradesh.
 3 August – China – Hebei, Qinhuangdao - when the T121 passenger train from Guangzhou to Changchun pulled by the No.3009 locomotive of DF4D diesel locomotive in the Beijing Railway Bureau Tianjin locomotive depot ran between the longjiaying and Shanhaiguan of the Tianjin–Shanhaiguan railway, it was attacked by debris flow. Huge mountain torrents washed away the railway revetment and rushed to the line, smashing the fuel tank of the No.3009 locomotive of DF4D diesel locomotive, causing oil leakage and locomotive derailment. Fortunately, there were no casualties in the accident. At 5:20, the railway was reopened.
 6 August – Argentina – At least 35 people are injured, six seriously, when a train derails and crashes into an electricity pylon in a central station of Retiro in Buenos Aires.
 6 August - United States - 32 cars derail from mixed-freight train that was traveling from Lynwood to Macon, Georgia. on the Norfolk Southern Railway line running aside Eighth Avenue in Cramerton, North Carolina. 31 homes are evacuated. Among the cars that derailed are tanker cars carrying phosphoric acid. Cleanup from the accident lasts approximately two months.
 21 August – United States – Two women celebrating the night before their return to university on a railway bridge die shortly after midnight when a CSX coal train derails on the bridge in downtown Ellicott City, Maryland, burying the women under coal. The NTSB investigation attributed the probable cause of the derailment to a broken rail.
 30 August – United Kingdom – A passenger train strikes a landslide and derails at St. Bees, Cumbria.
 11 September – Netherlands – A HTM city tram crashed into the back of another HTM city tram at an intersection near the railroad station of The Hague Hollands Spoor. Both were carrying a large number of passengers. 36 people were injured, including one of the operators.
 24 September – Italy – The train driver died, and 25 passengers were injured when a high-speed Freccia Argento train, travelling between Rome and Lecce collided with a lorry at a level crossing in Cisternino. The lorry driver was arrested and charged with manslaughter.
 1 October – United States – In California, Amtrak Train 712, travelling from Oakland to Bakersfield, is hit by a truck carrying cotton at a gated level crossing. Three of the train's five cars as well as the trailing GE P42DC locomotive, #94, derailed. No deaths, 50 injuries.
 4 October – Indonesia – A commuter train from Bogor to Jakarta derailed in Cilebut station. The train used a former Tokyo Metro 05 series EMU. No injuries reported, but the third car was damaged following the accident.
 23 October – Indonesia – Prambanan Express train derailed between Brambanan – Maguwo, the first car (women-only coach) was derailed and followed by another cars.
 26 October – Philippines – Bicol Express train, bound for Ligao, Albay was derailed at 0.05 in a flooded area of in Sariaya, Quezon, injuring eight of the 128 passengers rescued from the wreckage.
 26 October – Slovakia – Two trains collided between Bratislava-Vinohrady and Bratislava-Main Stations, leaving 23 injured. At 15:24 local time, passenger train Os2018 hit from behind another passenger train Os4618 that had stopped on the track. Preliminary investigation suspects the driver of the train Os2018 of causing the crash.
 29 October – United States – Thirteen cars of a 57-car Paducah & Louisville Railway (P&L) freight train derail near West Point, Kentucky. A tank car loaded with butadiene leaked and later caught fire while workers were repairing the track. No deaths, 5 injured. On 31 October, the train derailment exploded at 13:30 causing evacuations to be ordered in a 2-kilometer radius and an 8-kilometer radius to stay indoors. 3 were seriously burned in the explosion.
 1 November – Ukraine – Passenger train Kyiv-Sevastopol derails near Zaporizhzhia. There were 34 passengers in the overturned carriage, including 12 children. There are no victims in the accident.
 3 November – Australia – A Metro Trains Melbourne Comeng  collides with a lorry at the Abbotts Road level crossing in Dandenong South on the Cranbourne line. The train is derailed and the first car 306M ends up on its side. One passenger fatality due to a heart attack and 8 with minor injuries, and the driver was seriously injured. The lorry driver is uninjured.
 4 November – United Kingdom – A passenger train from Edinburgh to Aberdeen derails at Inverkeilor, Angus with one minor injury reported. The cause is believed to be non-accidental.
 5 November – Moldova – A wedding minibus collides with a passenger train Bender-Chișinău in Merenii Noi, leaving four people dead and six injured.
 9 November – Myanmar – 2012 Myanmar train crash: A train carrying liquid fuel and travelling from Mandalay to Myitkyina crashes and bursts into flames near Kantbalu; at least 27 people die and more than 80 are injured
 15 November – United States – Midland train crash: Around 4:30 PM, 4 people were killed and 16 others were injured when a Union Pacific ES44AC #7877 train strikes a parade float at heading to an event honoring wounded veterans in Midland, Texas. It was later reported that the train was speeding 62 MPH.
At least 50 children and the bus driver die in the crash; more than a dozen people are injured. The Egyptian minister of transport, Mohamed Rashad Al Matini, resigns.
 22 November – South Korea – A subway train rear-ends another in Busan, injuring 40.
 25 November – Italy – A train hits a van at a level crossing near Rossano, Province of Cosenza, Calabria, killing at least six workers from Romania and Bulgaria.
 29 November – United States - Amtrak train #91, The Silver Star, carrying 153 people to Miami slams into a dump truck in Orlando, Florida splitting it in half. The dump truck driver dies and the engine of The Silver Star is damaged. 10 passengers are hospitalized for minor injuries. Witnesses say that the truck driver failed to stop at a stop sign, and authorities claim the train was not speeding at the time of the impact. The rest of the passengers are taken to a downtown Orlando station.
 30 November – United States – Paulsboro train derailment: One of three daily trains, a Conrail train, that cross an old-style swing bridge derails near Paulsboro, New Jersey, resulting in one car leaking vinyl chloride into the air. The NTSB Report found the conductor was not trained how to tell if the bridge was locked after it had malfunctioned. About 100 people were treated for exposure to the chemical. Equipment damage estimates were $451,000. The emergency response and remediation costs totaled about $30 million.
 17 December – United States – A BNSF intermodal train from Chicago derails when a landslide strikes it in Everett, Washington. This event is captured on video.
 19 December – Germany – Around 20:20 CET, two freight trains tore through a broken-down bus and then derailed at a level crossing in Düsseldorf. The bus driver had to be treated for shock.

2013 

 15 January – Egypt – Badrashin railway accident – A passenger train derailed at Giza and collided with a freight train. 19 people died and 230 were injured.

 15 January – Sweden – 2013 Saltsjöbanan train crash – A passenger train on the Saltsjöbanan overran a set of buffer stops and crashed into a block of flats at Stockholm. While it was first announced that a cleaner had driven the train without authority, further investigations revealed that she had accidentally started the train that was parked in a depot without proper safety measures. She was seriously injured, no one else was injured.
 21 January – Austria – Two Vienna S-Bahn trains packed with morning commuters collided on a single-track stretch of line between Hütteldorf and Penzing in Vienna's suburbs, leaving 41 people injured, five of them seriously. Among the injured was the driver of one of the trains. Both trains were operating the Line S45 service, and both trains were made up of 4024-series rolling stock.
 21 January – Portugal – Alfarelos train crash - An InterCity train from Lisbon to Porto collides with a Regional train that it was supposed to overtake, after both trains fail to stop before a signal on red at Alfarelos, leaving 25 people injured.
 23 January – Slovakia – An intercity train IC507 from Bratislava to Košice hits a snowplow vehicle near Liptovský Mikuláš around 21.00 CET. The train driver died.
 31 January – Australia – A passenger train overshot the railway line and collided with Cleveland railway station, severely damaging a toilet block and injuring 14 people. The train was removed from the station in the early hours of the following morning.
 31 January – South Africa – Two passenger trains packed with school children and rush-hour commuters collided near Pretoria, injuring up to 300 people, 28 of them seriously. A moving train slammed into the back of a stationary train near Kalafong station.
 12 February – Japan – 15 people are injured when a Sanyo Electric Railway non-stop limited express train approaching Arai station collides with the rear end of a lorry and derails.
 10 April – India – Seven compartments of the 15228 Muzaffarpur-Yeshvantpur Weekly Express derailed near Arakkonam, 40 km from Chennai, killing one passenger and leaving another seriously injured.
 26 April – United States – At a rural Buffalo & Pittsburgh Railroad crossing, in Butler County, Pennsylvania (near Pittsburgh), an Allegheny Valley Railroad freight train carrying asphalt (with 2 locomotives, 29 cars; traveling at the ) strikes an Alliance for Nonprofit Resources Inc. Butler Area Rural Transit Authority bus carrying impaired seniors and younger adults at the Maple Street intersection. It's unclear whether the bus stopped on or before the tracks; the train's brakes are believed to have been applied and the horn to have sounded. Two people are flown by helicopter to area trauma centres–one was in critical condition, and a 91-year-old woman dies later at Allegheny General Hospital. Ten others, including the bus driver, are also hospitalised.
 30 April – Chile – A freight train derails near Collipulli and is then assaulted by men with fireweapons. Interior minister Andrés Chadwick says the Chilean Antiterrorist Law would be applied to those responsible for the attack.
 2 May – Serbia – Two passenger trains collide in a tunnel between Novi Beograd and Zemun. The two trains running in the same direction, one from Belgrade to Novi Sad, strike another running from Belgrade to Šid at 13.30 CET. No fatalities are reported, many are injured.
 3 May – Belgium – A freight train derails in Wetteren near Ghent. Three wagons carrying acrylonitrile explode and catch fire. One person dies and 49 are injured from toxic fumes in local neighbourhoods. 500 are evacuated 
 17 May – United States – Fairfield train crash – Sixty people are injured (five critically) and rail traffic from New York City to Boston is shut down after a Metro-North commuter train derails and plows into a second train in Fairfield, Connecticut.
 20 May – New Zealand – A morning peak Tranz Metro EMU commuter train derails near central Wellington after part of the undercarriage comes loose, puncturing a hole in the carriage floor in the process. Four people are injured and thousands of commuters affected as services are cancelled and 26 trains are withdrawn from service out of safety concerns. The TAIC investigation found that split pins had not been fitted to bolts on a spring park brake cylinder when the train was serviced ten weeks earlier.
 25 May – United States – Seven people are injured when two freight trains collide early in the morning at a rail intersection in Rockview, Missouri, causing a highway overpass to collapse (this occurred shortly after a bridge collapse in Washington state and the above-mentioned Fairfield, Connecticut commuter train collision). One of the trains derails, sending rail cars smashing into an overpass support pillar. Five of the injured are in automobiles, and two are on the train. All but one of the injured are treated and released from the hospital. 
 28 May – United States – A freight train derails outside Rosedale, Maryland, just outside Baltimore after colliding with a garbage truck. Fifteen cars from the CSX train Q409 derail and two catch fire. An explosion damages nearby buildings. Only the truck driver is injured. Those within a 20-block radius of the crash site are asked to evacuate.  Hazardous materials crews are sent to the scene. The National Transportation Safety Board sends a team to investigate the accident.
 4 June – Denmark – A morning train collides with a tractor close to a crossing near Holbæk. The tractor driver dies and six train passengers are injured.
At least three people die and another 315 are injured.

 6 July – Canada – Lac-Mégantic rail disaster – A Montreal, Maine and Atlantic Railway freight train containing 72 tank cars of crude oil runs away while unattended and derails in Lac-Mégantic, Quebec. Several cars explode, destroying over 30 buildings in the town's centre, roughly half of the downtown area, and requiring the demolition of all but three of the remainder of the buildings in the downtown area due to contamination by petroleum from the train; these combine to require the evacuation of 2,000 people, a third of the town's population. 42 are confirmed killed, along with 5 missing and presumed dead, making this the fourth-deadliest rail accident in Canadian history, and the deadliest since Canadian Confederation in 1867.
 7 July – Russia – At least 75 are injured in a train from Novosibirsk to Sochi when it derails between Krylovskaya and Kislyakovka in Krasnodar Krai.

 12 July – France – Brétigny-sur-Orge train crash – A passenger train with 385 passengers is derailed at speed by a track defect soon after leaving Paris, and smashes into a station platform. Six are confirmed dead and almost 200 are injured.
 12 July – France – Bessines-sur-Gartempe – A train carrying nuclear waste derails and travels about  before coming to a stop. It is reported that the Le Populaire du Centre newspaper received a message from an unknown anti-nuclear group taking responsibility for the Areva train derailment, although its authenticity was not confirmed.

 18 July – United States – July 2013 Spuyten Duyvil derailment – A CSX freight train carrying New York City municipal waste to an out-of-state landfill derails between the Marble Hill and Spuyten Duyvil stations on Metro-North Railroad's Hudson Line along the Harlem River the New York City borough of The Bronx. There are no injuries or deaths; however thousands of commuters are inconvenienced when that section of the line is closed for four days while the cars are rerailed and the spilled garbage cleaned up. Total damage done amounts to US$827,000; the National Transportation Safety Board determined that the cause was excessive track gauge due to inadequate maintenance by Metro-North.
 18 July - Sweden - 2 Gothenburg Tram trains collided with each other at a curve, 1 train was going at a curve and another was going straight on the same train track.

 24 July – Spain – Santiago de Compostela derailment – A high-speed train from Madrid to Ferrol, travelling at 190 km/h, well above the speed limit of 80 km/h, derails on a curve in Santiago de Compostela; at least 79 passengers die and 140 are injured.
 25 July – Pakistan – A passenger train travelling from Lahore to Rawalpindi overshoots and runs aground on a closed track in Gujranwala, Punjab; at least 2 people die and many are injured.

 29 July – Switzerland – Granges-près-Marnand train crash – Two passenger trains collide between Moudon and Payerne, at Granges-près-Marnand. One person dies and more than 40 are injured.
 5 August – United States – More than 20 cars of Union Pacific train derail in Louisiana near Lawtell.
 19 August – India – A high-speed Rajya Rani Express crashes into a crowd of Hindu pilgrims crossing the tracks at a remote station in the Saharsa District; 37 people die, more are injured.
 25 August – Mexico – A cargo train ridden by Central American migrants heading to the U.S. derails in Tabasco state; at least five die, at least 35 are injured. A number of people are trapped.
 2 September – Netherlands – The operator of a local train of Nederlandse Spoorwegen ignored a red light and was traveling well beyond the speed limit. The Automatic Train Control system didn't work. Therefore, the train severely damaged a turnout and ended up on the wrong track almost colliding with an intercity train at high speed. The train operators of both trains activated the brake systems just in time, thus avoiding a collision.
 16 September – United States – A Keokuk Junction Railway freight train derails near Seville, Illinois when a bridge over the Spoon River collapses under it.

 18 September – Canada – 2013 Ottawa bus–train crash – An OC Transpo double-decker bus collides with a Via Rail train in the Ottawa suburb of Barrhaven near Fallowfield Station; at least six bus passengers including the driver die. No one on board the train dies.
 19 September – United States – A CSX train derails in Southampton County, Virginia injuring two engineers and starting a fire.
 30 September – United States – An out-of-service Chicago Transit Authority train crashes head-on into a stopped train in Forest Park, Illinois, injuring 33 people.
 9 October – United States –  A Union Pacific train hits a stalled tractor trailer carrying pipes in Odessa, Texas. The accident caused the pipes to go flying and 100 US gallons (380 L) of diesel fuel from the locomotive to leak. Accident was caught on tape. No injuries.
 11 October – United States –  A truck carrying logs collides with a Durbin and Greenbrier Valley Railroad train carrying 63 people in Randolph County, West Virginia. The driver of the truck dies, and 23 on the train are injured, six of them seriously.
An investigation finds the cause to be poor track condition and an inadequate maintenance regime.
 19 October – Canada – A train with 13 cars carrying crude oil and liquefied petroleum gas derails west of Edmonton, Alberta. A fire results and no one was injured.
 19 October – Argentina – 2013 Buenos Aires train crash – At least 80 people are injured when a train crashes into a walk in the center of Buenos Aires.
 21 October – United States –  An inbound Metra Milwaukee West Line train collided with a stalled vehicle-hauling truck before arriving at Metra's Bartlett station in Bartlett, Illinois. 2 people were reported injured. The truck was carrying a total of 4 cars, including a black second-generation Cadillac CTS-V and a white fifth-generation Ford Mustang. Officials later reported a man from Pennsylvania was charged in connection with the derailment.
 23 October - United States - A train collided onto a car killing a YouTuber named Yoteslaya.
 24 October – United States – One person dies when four freight cars loaded with gravel derail at the SunRail station on State Road 46 in Sanford, Florida.
 31 October – Kenya –  At least eleven people died and thirty-four people are injured in Nairobi when a passenger train runs into bus at a high speed. Lack of proper safety measures at a railway crossing is listed as a possible cause.
 2 November – India – 10 people died and 20 were injured as they were run over by the 13352 Alapuzha-Dhanbad express, in Vizianagaram district. The victims had alighted from the 57271 Vijayawada-Rayagada train onto the tracks at Gotlam station when they heard a rumour that a compartment was on fire and they did not see the train coming.
The wetlands drain into a tributary of the Lubbub Creek, which empties into the Tombigbee River. The Aliceville spill was by far the largest rail-related U.S. oil spill in 2013.
 13 November – India – A herd of 40 elephants was struck by a passenger train in Chapramari Wildlife Sanctuary.
 15 November – India – 13 Coaches of Ernakulam Bound 12618 Mangala Lakshadweep Superfast Express were derailed near Ghoti village. 3 to 4 people died and dozens were injured.
 20 November – United Kingdom – A passenger train collides with the buffers at Chester railway station, Cheshire. One passenger is injured.
The train has 2 locomotives and 9 cars, 7 cars lost contact with the rail shortly after midnight according to officials on the scene. 4 minor injuries are reported.
 30 November – United States – A Southwestern Railroad (New Mexico) train derails outside Silver City, New Mexico, resulting in the deaths of the conductor, engineer, and a ride-along female passenger aged 50. The train is leaving a mine on a 6% slope when it experiences braking failure and travels out of control for miles. The locomotive eventually leaves the track on a curve, completely disconnecting from the eight cars heavily loaded with magnetite and slides into an arroyo (creek). All three occupants of the locomotive are killed on impact. The eight freight cars continue on the track a short distance before stopping. It is originally reported that the three victims were male employees, but a correction later specifies that the female ride-along passenger was not an employee.

 1 December – United States – December 2013 Spuyten Duyvil derailment - Derailment at Spuyten Duyvil, the Bronx, New York City – The engineer of a Metro-North Railroad passenger train from Poughkeepsie to Grand Central Terminal falls asleep with the train at full throttle. It is the first Metro-North accident with passenger fatalities. The engineer's fatigue was caused by severe, undiagnosed sleep apnea in combination with a recent shift change.
 9 December – Indonesia - 2013 Bintaro train crash – A commuter line train bound for Tanah Abang from Maja (Train number KA 1131, using Tokyo Metro 7000 series set 7021) collides with a truck loaded with oil, which explodes. Five people die; another is seriously injured. The accident is caused by the truck driver attempting cross the grade crossing shortly before being hit by an oncoming train from Pondok Ranji. The accident occurred at Grade Crossing number 57 at the S curve between Kebayoran and Pondok Ranji Station. The train involved is immediately written off because of major damage to car 7121 (7221 received minor damage)
 22 December – Kenya – A cargo train derailed in the Nairobi slum of Kibera several people are injured.
 28 December – India – At least 26 died and 12 were injured when an AC coach of the 16594 Bangalore City-Hazur Sahib Nanded express caught fire near Kothacheruvu in Anantapur district of Andhra Pradesh.

 30 December – United States – Casselton train derailment –  Several cars from westbound BNSF grain train 6990 derailed after a reused axle broke on the 45th car in the train. One minute and 15 seconds later, eastbound crude oil train 4934, operating on the adjacent eastbound track near Casselton, North Dakota, struck the derailed grain car, derailing locomotive 4934 and several of the oil tank cars. The derailed oil tankers caught fire and exploded, generating large clouds of black smoke which forced an evacuation of the area. No casualties were reported.

2014 
 7 January – Canada – A CN train carrying crude oil and propane derails near Plaster Rock, New Brunswick. The resulting fire forces an evacuation of the area within a two-kilometre radius. No injuries are reported.
 7 January – United States– A CTA Yellow Line passenger train derails in the Rogers Park neighborhood of Chicago, Illinois. The two-car train derailed in the early afternoon, briefly disrupting late afternoon rush hour traffic. No injuries were reported.
 11 January – Canada – A CP train carrying metallurgic coal derails in Burnaby, British Columbia. Seven cars of a 157 car train derail and spill coal into a fish-bearing stream.
 13 January – United States– A BNSF train derails near Kent, Washington after a landslide. The landslide also disrupted Amtrak and Sound Transit passenger rail service.
 17 January – United States – A BNSF train hauling fruits, vegetables and empty intermodal cars derails near Williston, North Dakota. The derailment also disrupted Amtrak passenger rail service (Empire Builder) between Minot, North Dakota and Havre, Montana. No injuries were reported.
 21 January – Netherlands – An empty, out-of-service tram/LRT vehicle of HTM's Randstadrail service crashed into an in-service tram/LRT Randstadrail vehicle at a tram stop. 4 passengers were injured.
 27 January – Canada – A CN train hauling liquefied petroleum gas, clay, and automobiles derails near the Saint-Basile community of Edmundston, New Brunswick. Five cars left the tracks, three carrying automobiles, and one each of LPG and clay. No injuries were reported.
 27 January – United States –  A Union Pacific train carrying scrap paper derails near Pollard Flat, California. Only one box car in the four-car train was carrying cargo, with no cargo spillage. The derailment caused disruption to Amtrak passenger rail service, resulting in riders being transported via buses between Oregon and California.
 28 January – United States – A CN train carrying plastic pellets derails near Mundelein, Illinois. One set of wheels on a hopper in a 110-car train derailed on a single lane track, resulting in disruptions of service over two days for several passenger and freight services as trains needed to be rerouted.
 28 January – United States – A CSX train carrying phosphoric acid derails near McDavid, Florida. 23 of the 69 cars derailed, resulting in the destruction of the tracks and bridge over Fletcher Creek, and chemicals leaking into the water. No injuries were reported.
 31 January – United States – A CN train carrying crude oil, methane and liquid fertilizer derails near New Augusta, Mississippi. 18 to 24 cars of the 85-car train derailed and began leaking. The derailment occurred in a rural area, but resulted in 12 families being evacuated and four lanes of U.S. 98 closed as emergency responders began to clean up the spill. No injuries were reported.
 4 February – Ukraine – 2014 Ukraine train bus collision - Bus driver ignores flashing crossing signals killing 13 and injuring 6.
 8 February – France – Annot derailment - A train derails between Digne-les-Bains and Nice when it is hit by a rock that rolled down the mountainside. Two people die and seven are injured.
 15 February – Japan – Two commuter trains, operating in heavy snow and limited vision, bound for Yokohama Motomachi, collide. A subsequent two-car train derails in Motosumiyoshi Station, Tokyu Toyoko Line, Kawasaki, Kanagawa. 19 persons are injured.
 20 February - United States - In Doctortown, Georgia, during the filming of the Midnight Rider Movie, an actor named Sarah Jones was hit and killed by a CSX Train at a train trestle, the train had hit a hospital bed and then injuring a person, 1 was killed and 1 was injured.
 17 March – Netherlands – A passenger train from Syntus crashes into the trailer of a truck that got stuck at a railroad crossing near the town of Almen. The truck driver escapes just in time. 3 train passengers are injured. The train was carrying 100 people.
 17 March – Netherlands – A tram/LRT vehicle of HTM's Randstadrail service crashes into a city tram on an intersection near the city border with Delft. 20 people are injured, one of them severely.
 24 March – United States – O'Hare station train crash - A CTA train in Chicago, Illinois overruns the buffers and goes up the escalator at O'Hare International Airport, injuring 32 people.
 4 April – Indonesia – Tasikmalaya derailment – The Kereta Api Indonesia passenger train Malabar derails after it is struck by a landslide, killing three and injuring 35.
 13 April – China – 15 people are sent to hospital after a passenger train derails in Heilongjiang province.
 16 April – Estonia – A truck crashes into Elron's train Stadler Flirt at Raasiku railway crossing. The train was heading from Tallinn to Tartu. Truck driver and one passenger are killed, 12 people are injured.
 22 April – Democratic Republic of the Congo – 2014 Katanga train derailment - 48+ fatalities.

 30 April – United States – CSX derailment: 15 tankers carrying crude oil derail and catch fire in Lynchburg, Virginia, striking fears of water contamination in the local area and beyond.

 2 May – South Korea – 2014 Seoul subway crash – A Seoul Metro train collides with another train due to ATS failure while stopping at Sangwangsimni Station. 388 injured (24 severely injured).
 4 May – India – A train traveling the Konkan Railway derails near Nidi railway station in Maharashtra, killing at least 18 and injuring 124.
 12 May – China – Liaoning, Huludao - The DF11 diesel locomotive 0066 locomotive of Shenyang Railway Bureau Shenyang locomotive depot pulled the T40 passenger train from Qiqihar to Beijing through Shensyang-Shanhaiguan railway. When the train ran to Tashan due to man-made damage, the coupler of DF11 diesel locomotive 0066 locomotive fell off, causing the locomotive to separate from the carriage, Constitute a general class C accident of passenger car separation.
 20 May – Russia – Naro-Fominsk rail crash - Near Naro-Fominsk, a freight train derails and fouls an adjacent line. A passenger train runs into it, killing nine and injuring around 50 people.
 26 May – India – 2014 Khalilabad derailment – Gorakhpur bound Gorakhdham Express rams into a stationary goods train near Khalilabad station in Sant Kabir Nagar district of Uttar Pradesh killing at least 25 and injuring over 50.
 5 June – Iran – A passenger train collided with a freight train in the north of the country. Ten people are killed.
 25 June – India – Dibrugarh Rajdhani Express (12236) derails near Chapra, Bihar, four die and eight are injured.
 4 July – United States – 19 cars of a Montana Rail Link train, carrying manufactured plane parts, soybeans, and alcohol from Kansas City, Kansas to Renton, Washington, derail. 3 airplane fuselages spill into a local river. No injuries are reported, and the nearby river pass and fishing gorge is closed to remove debris.
 12 July – Bulgaria – A long-distance passenger train derails at Kaloyanovets station, killing the driver and injuring 14 others. The train passed through turnouts set to diverging track at 104 km/h, 2.5 times over the limit of 40 km/h. EBICAB-700 protection system was available but wasn't turned on and the driver was not trained to use it.
 15 July – Russia – 2014 Moscow Metro derailment - A passenger train derails between Slavyansky Bulvar and Park Pobedy stations on the Moscow Metro. Twenty-one people die and over 150 are injured.
 17 July – France – Denguin rail crash - A TGV train collides with a regional TER train near Denguin. Several casualties are reported.

 24 July – India – Medak district bus-train collision – A school bus is hit by Nanded Passenger train at an unmanned railway level crossing in Masaipet village of Medak district. 18 bus passengers died including 16 students.
 2 August – Germany – A EuroCity express train of Deutsche Bahn collides with a freight train in the central station of Mannheim. 45 persons are hurt, five of which sustain severe injuries.

 13 August
 Switzerland – Tiefencastel derailment - A Rhaetian Railway passenger train is struck by a landslide and derails at Tiefencastel. Eleven people are injured.
 Philippines - A RT8D5M LRV heading to Taft Avenue station went past its barrier at the said station injuring several passengers and causing a post to fall over a car.
 17 August – United States – two Union Pacific locomotives hit head-on, in Hoxie, Arkansas, killing two crewmen and injuring two others. Several cars derail, resulting in a fire that causes the evacuation of 500 residents.
 22 August – Australia – a V/line V/locity (carrying just the driver and conductor) runs into a Metro Trains Comeng from Werribee to Flinders Street (carrying 60 passengers) between former stations Galvin and Paisley on the express section of the Werribee line. 9 were injured in the collision.
 4 September - United States - A switch glitch causes a minor coach derailment at the Strasburg Rail Road. No one was injured and the coach was back on the rails a few hours later, completely undamaged.
 30 September – India – the Lucknow–Barauni Express is rear-ended near Gorakhpur by the following train, the Krishak Express, which should have stopped at a red signal. At least 12 die and 46 are injured, 12 critically.
 5 October – United States – a Norfolk Southern freight train slams into a lowboy trailer in Mer Rouge, LA, seriously injuring both railroad crew and causing two engines along with 17 cars to derail. 50 homes are evacuated for about two hours due to the leakage of argon gas from the tank car.
 7 October – Canada – A CN train hauling dangerous goods derails near Clair, Saskatchewan. Twenty-six of the 100 rail cars derail, two of which leak petroleum distillate and catch fire. The approximately 50 residences of Clair and surrounding farms are evacuated and Highway 5 is shut down.
 16 October – United States – An excursion train of the Arkansas-Missouri Railroad stalls on the mainline near West Fork, Arkansas; the crew of the locomotive sent to help the train does not have the precise location of the stalled train and runs into the stalled train's locomotive after rounding a curve. 44 people are injured in the collision, 5 critically. An NTSB team was dispatched to investigate.
 28 October – United States – 24 were injured when an Amtrak train collides with a semi truck on U.S. Route 421 near Reynolds, Indiana.
 6 November – Canada – A QNSL train hits a landslide, causing the lead locomotives to derail, falling down an embankment into a river near Sept-Îles, Quebec. The lone engineer was killed.

2015 
 7 January – Canada – A CN freight train hauling 114 cars heading east from Edmonton, Alberta to Saskatoon, Saskatchewan derails between the community of Jarrow, Alberta and village of Irma. Twenty-three cars derail, of which one begins leaking a non-dangerous liquid adhesive. The ensuing cleanup resulted in the temporary closure of a section of Highway 14.
 14 January – United States – A Texas Department of Criminal Justice bus with 12 inmates and three officers is traveling from Abilene, Texas to El Paso, Texas when it collides with a train, near Odessa, Texas, killing 10.
 3 February – United States – Valhalla train crash: A Metro-North Railroad train strikes a Mercedes-Benz SUV at a crossing near Valhalla, New York, and catches fire, killing six people. 
 13 February – India – Anekal derailment: Derailment of an Intercity Express in Bangalore, Karnataka, kills ten and injures 150 more.
 16 February – Canada – A CN freight train transporting crude oil derails 80 km south of Timmins, Ontario. 29 of 100 cars derail, and seven crude oil tank cars catch fire. There are no injuries and the burning oil is contained to the area.

 16 February – United States – 2015 Mount Carbon train derailment - A CSX freight train derails in West Virginia. A broken rail caused nineteen Bakken crude oil tank cars to catch fire, with over 1,100 people evacuated from their homes nearby.

 22 February – United Kingdom – The London to Penzance express hits remains of a stone bridge parapet in Froxfield, Wiltshire. A police emergency number operator, improperly trained, sent police to investigate the truck hitting the parapet and should have also contacted the local rail control centre.
 24 February – United States – 2015 Oxnard train derailment: A Metrolink  train hits a road vehicle at Oxnard, California and derails. The train engineer dies and 29 others are injured.
Thirteen of the 107 cars in the train derail, some of which contain naphthalene. No injuries or spills were reported.
 2 March – United States – A Union Pacific train hauling hazardous material derails near Meacham, Oregon; 10 cars jump the tracks in a narrow canyon overlooking Meacham Creek.
 5 March – United States – A BNSF oil train derails in a rural area near Galena, Illinois. Twenty-one of the 105 cars, containing Bakken formation crude oil, leave the track and catch fire, which continues to burn. No injuries are reported.
A few passengers suffer slight injuries.
 7 March – Canada – A CN freight train derails near the small village of Gogama, Ontario. Forty of 100 cars derail, with 5 entering the Makami River and 7 carrying crude oil catching fire and burning for several days. It is the second CN derailment in the area in the past month.
 7 March – United Kingdom – 2015 Wootton Bassett rail incident: A charter train overruns a signal at Wootton Bassett, Wiltshire and comes to a stop foul of a junction, where an express train has passed through a minute earlier. As a direct result of the incident, West Coast Railways was banned from accessing all rail lines in the United Kingdom until remedial preventions were put in place.
 9 March – United States – 2015 Halifax train crash: An Amtrak passenger train collides with a tractor trailer in Halifax, North Carolina. No life-threatening injuries were reported. The accident was caught on video.
 15 March – United States – A car ignores warning signals at an open grade crossing in Louisville, Kentucky. A Norfolk Southern freight train with leased locomotives from Union Pacific Railroad crashes into the car with four Bhutanese passengers in it where they were returning from soccer practice. Two passengers sitting on the right side were killed in the crash while two were critically injured and taken to a nearby hospital. The accident was also caught on camera by two railfans.
 20 March – India – 2015 Uttar Pradesh train accident: 15 people are killed, 150 are injured as the Dehradun-Varanasi Janta Express derails in Uttar Pradesh's Rae Bareli.
 26 March – Thailand – 2015 Phachi collision - A passenger train runs into the rear of another in Phachi District. 52 people are injured in the collision, three seriously.
 28 March – United States – 2015 Los Angeles train crash: An Expo Line train collides with an automobile at an intersection, injuring 12.
 31 March – Australia – A freight train runs into the rear of another at Keswick, South Australia. At least one of the trains is derailed and two level crossings are blocked.
 15 April – United Kingdom – An empty Southern Class 377 train unit no. 118 derails in Lovers Walk, Brighton causing damage to electrical cables that supply power. No passengers were in the train and the driver is not injured by the results. Buses replaced trains in the afternoon and the morning of 16/04/15. 73202 was attached to the rear/north end of 377118 at 16/04/15 and the line blockage was reopened after 377118 was re-railed on the track.
 27 April – United States – Several well cars of a Union Pacific train derail off a bridge near Bridge City, Louisiana during a severe storm. The event is caught on tape from a car's dashcam.
 28 April – South Africa – Johannesburg train crash: Two passenger trains collide at Denver station, near Johannesburg. One person is killed and about 240 are injured.
 28 April - United States - Roswell, New Mexico: Two BNSF trains collide into each other causing both trains to derail; one of the trains nearly falls on its side, 1 person is dead and another is injured.
 5 May – Austria – Graz: Two passenger trains collide, killing one of the drivers; eight passengers are injured.
 6 May – United States – A BNSF train derails near Heimdal, North Dakota, which ignites a crude oil fire in six tanker cars and forces the evacuation of approximately 40 nearby residents. No injuries or fatalities were reported.

 12 May – United States – 2015 Philadelphia train derailment: Amtrak Northeast Regional No. 188 traveling from Washington, D.C. to New York City derails at high speed while negotiating a curve at Philadelphia, Pennsylvania. Eight people are killed and more than 200 injured.
 13 May – United States – A CSX freight train collides with a MARTA bus in East Point, Georgia that was trapped on a railroad crossing by traffic while stopped at a traffic light. Six people were injured in the wreck. The accident was caught on tape by cameras inside the bus.
 16 May – Germany – Ibbenbüren train collision: A passenger train collides with an agricultural vehicle on a level crossing at Ibbenbüren, North Rhine-Westphalia. Two people are killed and twenty are injured.
Two people are killed and over 100 are injured.
Three people are injured.
 11 June – United States – Nine cars (and a locomotive) of an 84-car Kansas City Southern freight train derail in Houston, Texas. Two cars fall from the track, with one falling onto a road below. No injuries were reported and no cargo was spilled.
 16 June – Tunisia – 2015 El Fahs train accident: 19 people are killed and 98 injured when a rush hour passenger train hits a lorry and derails at an unmarked crossing in El Fahs. Most of the dead were passengers on the train, which hit the lorry around 60 kilometres south of Tunis, the transport ministry said.
Five people are injured.
 30 June – Japan – A 71-year-old man takes his own life by a bottle of gasoline on the Nozomi (train) No. 225, in Odawara, Kanagawa.
 2 July – United States – Maryville, Tennessee train derailment: A CSX train carrying hazardous materials goes off of its tracks near Knoxville, Tennessee. Over 5,000 citizens were displaced from their homes within a two-mile (three kilometer) radius.
 2 July – Pakistan – 2015 Gujranwala derailment: A Pakistan Army passenger train is derailed when a bridge over a canal collapses under it at Gujranwala. Nineteen of the 300 people on board are killed.
 15 July - United States - Sandersville, Georgia, two Norfolk Southern trains collide onto each other, four people were injured.
Over 100 people are injured.
 22 July – Czech Republic – 2015 Studénka train crash: Czech Railways passenger train SC 512, a ČD Class 680, hits a truck at a crossing near Studénka railway station. 3 people die and 13 others are injured.
There are no injuries amongst the 70 passengers and crew.
 4 August – India – Harda twin train derailment: Two passenger trains are derailed near , Madhya Pradesh due to the trackbed being washed away by the Machak River. Twenty-nine people are killed.
 8 August – Russia – Four railcars of Passenger train number 233 en route from Yekaterinburg to Adler, Krasnodar Krai run off the rails in Mordovia. Five passengers are injured.
 16 August – Hungary – Two passenger trains collide head-on at low speed when both the first train's driver and the station master of Galgamácsa forget to tell each other that the train crossing on the single-track railroad was moved to Nógrádkövesd from Acsa-Erdokürt and went forward from Nógrádkövesd despite the reserved track. The accident took place near Galgaguta. 26 injuries (0 fatal) occurred.
 12 September – Germany – A passenger train collides with a car in Monzingen, killing the five occupants of the car.
 12 September – India – A passenger train derails on the Kalka-Shimla Railway killing two and injuring nine of the 37 passengers on board.
 5 October – United States – Amtrak  Vermonter #55 strikes rocks on the line and derails near Northfield, Vermont.
 24 October – United States – A southbound Union Pacific freight train hauling 64 cars of gravel and concrete materials is swept off the tracks by flood waters just north of Corsicana, Texas, after Hurricane Patricia's weak remnants dumped 18 inches of rain on the area over a two-day period. Both crew members were rescued from the flood waters uninjured.

 13 November – United States – Five tanker cars on a train carrying crude oil derailed at Norfolk Southern's Abrams Yard in King of Prussia, Pennsylvania.
 14 November – France – Eckwersheim train crash - A high-speed TGV test train derails near Eckwersheim, north of Strasbourg, killing eleven people; no criminal cause is suspected, despite the event taking place hours after the November 2015 Paris attacks.
 14 November – United States – A Norfolk Southern freight train collides with a Toyota Camry in Morrisville, North Carolina, near Cary, killing the two elderly passengers of the vehicle.
 17 November – Pakistan – Aab-e-Gum derailment - The Jaffar Express is derailed at Aab-e-Gum. Twenty people are killed and 96 are injured.
 28 November – United Kingdom – A passenger train collides with cattle on the line at Dalreoch, Dunbartonshire and is derailed.
 1 December – Austria – A freight train on the Semmering railway line collides with a single locomotive that had been ordered to tow the train back into a station when it had to stop on the track because another train ahead had broken down. The engineer in the assistant locomotive is injured and several rail cars are derailed in the Polleroswand tunnel causing a complete shutdown of the Semmering line for two weeks. Investigations suggest that the freight train driver had released the brakes of his train too early which made the train roll back on the steep track crashing into the approaching support engine.

2016
 4 January – United States – A Tri-Rail passenger train collides with a garbage truck which had broken down on a grade crossing at Lake Worth station, Florida and is derailed. Twenty-two people are injured.
 8 January – Thailand – A passenger train collides with a Cattle truck near Phetchaburi Railway Station, Phetchaburi province and is derailed. 3 people are killed, 34 are injured.
 10 January - Bangladesh - A passenger train derails at Narsingdi killing two people and injuring ten.
 12 January – Philippines – A PNR Metro South Commuter Line train from Alabang collides with a jeepney at the Pedro Gil Street crossing near Paco station in Paco, Manila. One person dies from head injuries and 6 are injured.
 20 January – Italy – a head-on crash between 2 light rail trains in Cagliari at a rate of 30 km/h-40 km/h results in the injuries of 70 passengers, mostly students from a nearby school.
 28 January – United States – A southbound Tri-Rail train derails in Pompano Beach, Florida. One person is injured.
 31 January – Egypt – Seven are killed and scores injured when a train crashes into a truck in Giza, just outside Cairo. Reports say the gatekeeper forgot about the coming passenger train until a truck pulled out in front of the crossing; the gatekeeper is now under investigation.
 5 February -India - 4 coaches of Kanyakumari-Bangalore City Express derail near Vellore. Few injured.
 9 February – Germany – Bad Aibling rail accident: Eleven people are killed in a head-on collision between two passenger trains near Bad Aibling; investigators attributed it to the dispatcher giving the trains incorrect information while he was distracted by a game he was playing on his mobile phone.
Sixteen of the 56 people on board are injured, the other 40 suffer from shock.
 23 February – Netherlands – Dalfsen train crash: A passenger train collides with a crane at Dalfsen, Overijssel. One person is killed, six are injured.
 7 March – United States – An Altamont Corridor Express train derails after striking a fallen tree in Niles Canyon near Sunol, California. The lead car falls into Alameda Creek. Fourteen people are injured, four seriously.
Thirty-two people are injured.
 3 April – United States – 2016 Chester, Pennsylvania, train derailment: Two people die and thirty-one suffer injuries when an Amtrak train collides with a backhoe on the tracks and a car derails in Chester, near Philadelphia.
 4 April – Thailand – A double-decker bus rams into a train at an unguarded railway crossing in Nakhon Chai Si District, Nakhon Pathom Province, killing three people and injuring 25 others.
 8 April – Costa Rica – Two commuter trains collide head-on near Pavas injuring more than 200.
 9 April – Sweden – An empty passenger train crashes through buffer stops at Karlstad whilst being shunted into a siding that was too short for it. Several staff on board are injured.
 10 April – United Kingdom – An Abellio Greater Anglia Class 170 passenger train collides with an agricultural tractor on a level crossing at Roudham, Norfolk. The tractor driver is seriously injured, six passengers sustain minor injuries. The cause of the accident was the signalman incorrectly giving permission for the tractor to cross in front of the train.
 13 April – Japan – An out of service bullet train owned by the Kyushu Railway Co. derails near Kumamoto Station after a 6.5 magnitude earthquake. Nobody is injured.
 19 April – Thailand – A garbage truck breaks through a grade crossing and hits passenger train No. 447 from Surat Thani to Sungai Kolok with six carriages in the Phunphin District, Surat Thani Province. The truck hits the fifth and sixth cars, severely damaging and them and derailing the train. The truck driver is killed and six persons are injured.
 22 April – South Korea – A passenger train derails near Yulchon station, Yeosu, probably due to excessive speed. One person is killed and eight are injured.
 1 May - India - Old Delhi-Faizabad Express derails near Hapur while travelling at 80 km/h. At least a dozen injuries were reported, none of them serious.
 6 May - India - Side collision for the Chennai Central - Thiruvananthapuram Central superfast and a suburban train near Pattabiram. Seven Injured 
 8 May – Nigeria – A runaway train derails in Jebba, resulting in four casualties.
 20 May – Kazakhstan – A collision between two freight trains near the Sino-Kazakh border derails 18 cars and damages  of track, leaving several other trains stranded in the Alataw Pass.
 20 May – Switzerland – A high-speed train collides with a tour bus at Interlaken leaving 16 people injured.
 3 June – United States – 2016 Union Pacific oil train fire: A crude oil train derails due to defective track and catches fire at Mosier, Oregon. The town was evacuated.
 6 June – Belgium – Hermalle-sous-Huy train collision: A passenger train runs into the rear of a freight train at Hermalle-sous-Huy. Three people are killed, about 40 are injured, nine seriously.
 23 June – South Africa – 130 people are injured in a head-on crash between 2 trains near the city of Durban.
 26 June – United States – An Amtrak passenger train collides with a van on a grade crossing in southern Colorado. Five of the six persons in the van die.
 28 June – United States – Two BNSF freight trains collide head-on near Panhandle, Texas. Three crewpeople were killed, and one was injured when they jumped from one of the trains. The wrecked locomotives caught fire following initial impact. The event recorders in the locomotives were completely destroyed and unrecoverable, rendering actions by crew members unaccountable before the crash.
 12 July – Italy – Andria–Corato train collision: Two passenger trains collide head-on near Andria in the Apulia region, killing 23 people and injuring 54.
 14 July - United States - Early in the morning, Norfolk Southern train 164 strikes a tractor-trailer in Chattanooga, Tennessee, resulting in the train derailing and the lead locomotive overturning.
 22 July - Iran - At least 30 people were injured after a train collides with a truck at a railway crossing in Mazandaran.
 28 July - United States - 9:10pm, Norfolk Southern coal train experiences derailment in Spring City, Tennessee. 49 cars experienced derailment and lost their contents in the middle of city limits, almost hitting the historic train depot in town. Cause was determined to be a fault wheel on one of the privately owned coal cars.
 13 August - Finland - Two cargo trains collide, causing a derailment of a locomotive and three cargo wagons in Oulu. The rail yard and train equipment suffered substantial damages. A driver of the colliding locomotive was brought to hospital with minor injuries.
 9 September – Spain – O Porriño derailment: A passenger train derails at O Porriño. Four people are killed and 49 are injured.
The locomotive is derailed. The train driver and four passengers sustained minor injuries.
 15 September – Pakistan – A passenger train and a freight train collide near Multan. Six people are killed and more than 150 are injured.
 16 September – United Kingdom – London Midland British Rail Class 350 350 264 strikes a landslide and derails in the Hunton Bridge Tunnel, near . Unit 350 233 then collides with the derailed train. Two people are injured.
 20 September – Canada – A 3-car C-Train owned by the Calgary Transit derails and runs into a pole, injuring the driver.
 24 September – Algeria – Two trains crash into each other killing 1 and injuring 60.
 29 September – United States – 2016 Hoboken train crash: A NJ Transit train entering Hoboken Terminal overruns the end-of-track bumper block and smashes into a wall, causing structural damage to the terminal building. A woman on the platform is killed by falling debris, and 114 others are injured.
 8 October – United States – A Long Island Railroad train derails near New Hyde Park. Thirty-three people are injured—26 passengers and 7 employees, four seriously, when an LIRR commuter train struck a work train that was partially fouling the track near a switch.
 21 October - Cameroon - 2016 Eséka train derailment: A packed train derails near Eséka on the Camrail line between Yaoundé and  Douala. By 30 October 2016, the official number of casualties had reached 79 dead, with 551 injured.
 3 November - Pakistan - Karachi rail crash: Two passenger trains collide near Karachi's Landhi Railway Station, killing at least 21 and injuring more than 60 others.
 9 November - United Kingdom - 2016 Croydon tram derailment: A Tramlink two car tram, No. 2551, derails and overturns while approaching the Sandilands tram stop in the London Borough of Croydon, killing seven and injuring 58, first passenger fatalities in a UK tram accident since 1959.
 20 November - India - Pukhrayan train derailment - Fourteen coaches of Indore–Patna Express derail near Kanpur, killing 150 people and injuring another 150 in India's deadliest rail disaster since 1999.
 25 November – Iran – Semnan–Damghan train collision – Four coaches derail (two of which caught fire) after a passenger train crashes into a second passenger train that had broken down at Haf-Khan, Semnan Province, killing 49 and injuring 103.
 29 November - Romania - A collision between 2 train left 1 dead and 1 injured in critical condition. The accident occurred in Gorj County.
 10 December – Bulgaria – Hitrino train derailment – A Bulmarket Rail Cargo freight train traveling from Burgas to Ruse derails at Hitrino station. Two tank cars, loaded with propane-butane (LPG) and propylene, strike an electricity pylon and explode, killing seven and injuring 29.
 28 December – India  – Sealdah-Ajmer Express train derails near Kanpur, injuring 63.
 28 December - Tunisia - 2016 Djebel Jelloud train accident - A collision between a train and a bus near Tunis, killing 5 and injuring 52.
 28 December - Tunisia - A collision between a freight train and a lorry left 1 dead (train driver's assistant) and 1 injured (train driver). The accident occurred in Métlaoui.

2017 
 4 January – United States – 2017 Brooklyn train crash: A Long Island Rail Road commuter train collides with a buffer at Atlantic Terminal in Brooklyn, New York. At least 103 people are injured.
 21 January – India – Kuneru train derailment: A passenger train derails in Andhra Pradesh, killing at least 41 people and injuring 68 others.
 24 January – United States – A FrontRunner passenger train collides with a semi-trailer truck on a grade crossing in North Salt Lake, Utah. Weather caused the crossing arms to remain down and safe but responding employee disabled the crossing safety system so when the train approached, the gates did not activate. No one was injured.
 8 February - United States - Miami: A Metromover train collides with a piece of engineering equipment near Brickell Train Station, one person is killed and one injured.
 14 February – Australia – A V/Line VLocity diesel multiple unit collides with a vehicle that had been abandoned on the line near , Victoria and is derailed. Two people are taken to hospital.
 14 February – Luxembourg – One person is killed and 2 are injured when a local commuter train crashes head-on with a freight train near Bettembourg, not far from the French border.
 14 February – United States – A driver of a van is killed after intentionally crossing in front of the University of Colorado A Line train in Aurora, Colorado.
 17 February – Saudi Arabia – A passenger train derails near Dammam due to flooding of the line. Eighteen of the 199 people on board are injured.
One person is killed and twenty-seven are injured.
 20 February – South Africa – Two trains on the same track at the Lynn Ross station in Rosslyn in Pretoria collide and leave more than 100 people injured.
 21 February – United States – A train on SEPTA's Market-Frankford Line derails in a rail yard loop in Upper Darby, Pennsylvania when it crashes into a stopped train, seriously injuring one of the operators and injuring three others. Cars from the derailed train collide with a third train on an adjacent track.
 28 February  – United Kingdom – 2017 Liverpool Lime Street wall collapse.
 7 March – United States – Three locomotives and 20 cars of a CSX freight train on the River Subdivision partially derail at Newburgh, New York, after striking a disabled construction vehicle stuck on the tracks at a grade crossing in a steel-fabrication plant. There are no injuries and hazardous materials the train was carrying are not spilled; however a neighboring road is closed to traffic for several days during cleanup of spilled diesel fuel.
 7 March – United States – Four people are killed in Biloxi, Mississippi, when a CSX freight train hits their charter bus after it gets stuck on the tracks at a grade crossing. The wreck was caught on video.

 10 March – United States – A Union Pacific freight train convoying ethanol derails and bursts into flames as it crosses a trestle bridge near Graettinger, Iowa. At least 27 of 101 cars derail.
 20 March – United Kingdom – A freight train derails at East Somerset Junction, Witham Friary, Somerset.
 22 March – Switzerland – A Eurocity 158 traveling from Milan to Basel comes off the tracks in Lucerne injuring six people. Lucerne station was closed for four days.
 29 March – India – Eight carriages of the Mahakaushal Express from Jabalpur to New Delhi derail at Mahoba in Uttar Pradesh. 25 people are injured.
 8 April – Russia – Two passenger trains collide in Moscow, injuring about 50 people.
 1 May – Germany – An ICE 2 electric multiple unit derails at Dortmund Hauptbahnhof. Two people are injured.
 13 May – Greece – 2017 Adendro train derailment: A train heading from Athens to Thessaloniki derails near Adendro killing three people and injuring ten.
 15 May – United States – A Union Pacific freight train carrying automobiles, industrial chemicals and other materials derailed 18 of 77 cars in Elkhart, Illinois with no injuries reported.
 2 June - United States - In Washington, DC, a DC Streetcar train crashed into a Metro Bus; 10 were injured.
 20 June – United States – Three refrigerated cars carrying butter on an East Penn Railroad train derailed in Sellersville, Pennsylvania.
 27 June – United States – A southbound New York City Subway train derailed then caught on fire near 125th Street. The derailment, caused by improperly secured replacement rails, resulted in 39 minor injuries.
 28 June - United States - A Norfolk Southern train slams into a truck at Bangor, Pennsylvania. The driver ignored the crossing, and said that the crossing was deactivated, but it was active when the train hit the truck. No injuries or deaths occurred. The driver was charged.
 2 July – United States – An Amtrak passenger train derails at Steilacoom, Washington. A few of the 267 passengers on board sustain minor injuries.
 21 July – United States – The second set of wheels on a southbound New York City Subway train jumped the track near Brighton Beach. Nine people suffered injuries due to improper maintenance of the car in question.
 26 July – Cameroon – A freight train operated by Camrail and carrying hydrocarbon products derails near Makondo. Five cars completely overturn. One guard of the train is killed.
 28 July – Spain – 2017 Barcelona train crash: A train runs into the buffers at França Station in Barcelona. 56 people are injured, three in a critical condition.
 11 August – Egypt – Alexandria train collision: Two trains collide near Alexandria. 40 people are killed and 133 injured.
 14 August – United Kingdom – A freight train derails near Queen Adelaide near the Ely North junction, with 11 of 33 wagons of the freight train derailed. No one was injured.
 15 August – United Kingdom – 3 separate incidents happened at London during morning rush hour, which a loud bang and smoke at the London Underground Central Line platforms at Holborn station causes evacuation of the station while later a train hits the buffers at London King's Cross and then another passenger train collides with a freight train at London Waterloo. 2 people received minor injuries on the derailment at London King's Cross.
 19 August – India – 2017 Khatauli train derailment: The Kalinga Utkal Express train derails near Khatauli in Muzaffarnagar district of Uttar Pradesh. 23 people are killed and more than 60 are injured.
 20 August – United Kingdom – A train was partially derailed while leaving London Paddington at low-speed. No injuries was reported.
 22 August – United States – A SEPTA Norristown High Speed Line remain runs into the rear of an out of service Norristown High Speed Line train at 69th Street Terminal in Upper Darby, Pennsylvania. Thirty-three people are injured, four seriously.
 23 August – India – Auraiya train derailment: Train Kaifiyat Express derails between Pata and Uchhalda railway stations around 02:50 am (IST). Seventy-four people are injured.
 11 September - Switzerland - An engine of the Matterhorn Gotthard Bahn collides with its own coaches during maneuvers at the railway station of Andermatt, injuring about 30 people.
 2 October - Poland - An EN57 electric multiple unit hits a 41-year-old woman passing between platforms 1 and 2 of Pabianice station, crushing her leg.
 6 October - Russia - A train hits a bus carrying Uzbek passengers and kills 16 people.
 8 October - India - A train hits a cement mixer truck in Punjab. The train driver is killed.
 26 October - Finland - Four people (three military conscripts and a train passenger) are killed and four conscripts are injured after a passenger train collides with an off-road military lorry in Raseborg. The collided vehicles were Sisu A2045 and Dm12.
 12 November - Democratic Republic of the Congo - A train carrying flammable material catches fire after crashing into a ravine. 33 people are killed.
 14 November – Pakistan - The brakes on the Akbar Express failed near Walhar Railway Station resulting in a runaway train. The driver had to jump for his life before the locomotive derailed 70 inches from a busy junction. They were supposed to halt the Akbar Express at the outer signal but they overshot it and consequently the Quetta-bound train rammed into the stationary goods train.
 15 November - Singapore - Joo Koon rail accident: An inbound train to Tuas Link collided with a stationary out of service train at Joo Koon platform due to a bug in the train's signalling equipment, resulting in 36 injuries. Train services between Joo Koon and Tuas Link were temporarily suspended on 16 November and resumed on 19 November, while services between Joo Koon and Gul Circle were suspended for a month to facilitate maintenance works for signalling equipment.
 25 November -
 India - A passenger train derails in Chitrakoot District, Uttar Pradesh. Three people are killed.
 India - A freight train derails at Odisha.
 27 November - Belgium - Morlanwelz train collision and runaway: A passenger train collides with a car on a level crossing at Morlanwelz, Hainaut and is damaged by the consequent fire. The car driver and all on board the train escape without injury. It struck and killed two track workers and severely injured two others before colliding with a passenger train at Strépy-Bracquegnies. Five passengers on the train that is run into are injured.
 29 November - Spain - Heavy rains cause a train traveling from Málaga to Seville to derail near Arahal, leaving 27 injured, two seriously.
 2 December – United States – A Mount Hood Railroad passenger train derails  from Hood River, Oregon. There are no injuries amongst the 214 people on board. The line is closed until 8 December.
 5 December - Germany - Meerbusch train crash: A passenger train runs into the rear of a freight train near Meerbusch. Fifty people are injured, nine seriously.
 14 December – France – Perpignan crash: A school bus is struck by a passenger train on a level crossing at Millas and is cut in two. Six people are killed and 24 are seriously injured.
 18 December - United States - 2017 Washington train derailment: Amtrak Cascades passenger train #501, the inaugural run of the Cascades service on a new rail line designed for higher speeds than the previous route, fails to slow down when approaching a  speed restriction and derails on a bridge over I-5 in Pierce County, Washington. Three people are killed and over 80  injured.
 22 December - Spain - A passenger train collides with a buffer stop at  station, Madrid. Thirty-nine people are injured.
 22 December - Austria - In Vienna, a passenger train crashed into another train at full speed. The train crash happened at 6:00 PM, 20 people were injured.
 24 December - Ukraine - a passenger train collides with an excavator and was derailed at Kysylyn. None of the 140 passengers are injured.
 25 December -  Russia - In Moscow, a bus skidded on ice making it crash into a train station which caused trains to delay, 4 people were killed and many people were injured.

2018
 3 January - Switzerland - A carriage of a Montreux Oberland Bernois Railway train is blown off the tracks (by strong winds) at Lenk. Eight people are injured.
 4 January - South Africa - 2018 Kroonstad train crash: A passenger train collides with a lorry on a level crossing  near Kroonstad and is derailed. At least one of the carriages catches fire. Twenty people are killed and 254 are injured.
 22 January – Australia – A passenger train collides with a buffer stop at Richmond, New South Wales. Sixteen people are injured.
 25 January - Italy - Pioltello train derailment: A train derailed in Pioltello near Milan, leaving at least three people dead and over 100 injured, including over 10 seriously. The derailment occurred between the Treviglio and the Pioltello railway stations.
 28 January - United States - A freight train collides with a truck in Harrodsburg, Kentucky. The accident occurred after 8:30pm EST between a Norfolk Southern freight train and a commercial motor vehicle truck at a grade crossing with US 127. The truck reportedly spilled 40 gallons (150 L) of fuel, and NS 8104, a heritage unit, was involved.
 31 January - United States - 2018 Crozet, Virginia train crash: A chartered Amtrak train carrying Republican Party lawmakers from Washington, D.C. to a retreat in White Sulphur Springs, West Virginia collides with a garbage truck at a grade crossing near Crozet, Virginia. One person on the truck is killed and six people are injured.
 4 February - United States - Cayce, South Carolina train collision: Amtrak Silver Star train #91 traveling from New York City to Miami collided with a CSX freight train in Cayce, South Carolina, killing at least two people, injuring at least 100 others, and spilling thousands of gallons of fuel.
 12 February - Austria - Niklasdorf train collision: Two passenger trains are in a sidelong collision at Niklasdorf. One person is killed and 22 are injured.
 28 February - Egypt – A head-on crash between two trains killed at least 15 people and injured dozens more near Cairo.
Passengers abandon five of the trains due to incident management, communication and train equipment issues.
 18 March - United States - Two Norfolk Southern freight trains are in a head-on collision in Scott County, Kentucky. Four people are injured. Norfolk Southern blames the engineer and conductor of one of the trains for the accident and sues them.
 23 March - United States - A Long Island Railroad train collides with a car that drove onto the tracks because of a GPS in Mineola, New York. No injuries or deaths are reported.
 6 April - Indonesia - A Sancaka train is in a head-on collision with a semi-truck in Ngawi. Two persons are killed and three are injured.
 20 April - Austria - Two passenger trains collide at Salzburg, injuring around 40 people.
 2 May - United States - The last two cars of a Norfolk Southern freight train carrying stone derail along Amtrak's Northeast Corridor in Ridley Township, Pennsylvania, affecting passenger service along Amtrak and SEPTA Regional Rail's Wilmington/Newark Line.
 7 May - Germany - A passenger train collides head-on with a freight train that had been parked on the same track in Aichach, Bavaria. The train driver and a passenger are killed in this accident.
 19 May - United States - A CSX freight train is derailed when a bridge collapses under it at Franconia, Virginia.
 23 May - Italy - A Trenitalia Turin-Ivrea regional train crashes into an oversize load truck that had been stuck between the bars of a railroad crossing near the town of Caluso, Metropolitan City of Turin, Piedmont. The accident happens on Chivasso–Ivrea railway. Two people are killed and 18 are injured.
 30 May - Mexico - Two Ferromex trains collide between Chihuahua and Ciudad Juárez. The conductor of the northbound train is killed and the other 5 members of the train crew are injured, a fire erupted from the wreck which could be seen for several kilometres. The accident was determined as human error, the engineer of the southbound train had exceeded the authorised speed limit and was running ahead of time.
 17 June - United States - A CSX freight train consisting of 89 cars derails and causes an explosion outside of the city of Princeton, Indiana. Of the 23 derailed cars, 5 contain propane. Authorities evacuate homes within a  radius of the derailment.
 22 June - United States - A BNSF oil train was derailed near Doon, Iowa. An estimated 230000 gallons (870 600 L) of oil spilled.
 26 June - Austria - A Mariazellerbahn passenger train was derailed near Sankt Pölten. Thirty people were injured, three seriously.
 8 July - Turkey - Çorlu train derailment: a passenger train from Istanbul to Edirne was derailed in Çorlu, killing 24 people and injuring over 300.
 9 July - United States - In Garfield, New Jersey, a NJ Transit Train crashed into bus at a railroad crossing, 13 people were injured.
 21 July - United States - Union Pacific steam locomotive 844 strikes and kills pedestrian Kelly Yarish in Henderson, Colorado while pulling a special excursion from Denver, Colorado to Cheyenne, Wyoming. Yarish was standing too close to the tracks while attempting to photograph the 844.
 5 August - United States - 2018 Station Square Derailment: a Norfolk Southern train carrying household items derailed after hitting a defect in the rails. The accident caused $1.8M in damage.
 12 August - Romania - A freight train with tank cars derails at Cârcea, near Craiova, when a viaduct collapses whilst the train was going over it.
 23 August - Bosnia and Herzegovina - Two freight trains collided head-on in Donja Jablanica, near Jablanica killing 2 people and leaving 2 survivors (One person was seriously injured and second person jumped out before crash). One of the two freight trains went through red light.
 15 September - Canada - Ponton train derailment: A Hudson Bay Railway freight train carrying liquid petroleum derails near Ponton, Manitoba, leading to a diesel spill and the death of the train's conductor.
 20 September - Netherlands - Oss rail accident: a passenger train collides with a Stint cart on a level crossing at Oss, killing four people and injuring two.
 4 October - United States - A Union Pacific freight train loses its brakes and collides with the rear of a stationary train in Granite Canyon, Wyoming. Preliminary NTSB reports have put the cause at a kink or pinched air hose along with a communication failure between the head end and the train's end-of-train device. Two are killed: the locomotive engineer and conductor of the striking train.
 12 October - Germany - In Frankfurt, an Ice Train caught on fire, train passengers were able to escape. The train crash happened between Cologne and Munich, 3 people were injured.
 16 October - Morocco - A train from Rabat to Kenitra derails in Bouknadel, killing 7 people and injuring about 80.
 19 October - India - Amritsar train disaster: A train runs into a crowd celebrating the Dusshera festival near Amritsar, killing more than 50 people and injuring over 200.
 21 October - Taiwan - 2018 Yilan train derailment: A Puyuma express train, operating service No. 6432 from Shulin to Taitung, derails at Xinma Station, Yilan County, killing 18 people and injuring another 175. This accident is the worst in Taiwan since 1991.
 6 November - Australia - A freight train transporting iron ore from Newman to Port Hedland, Western Australia runs away after the driver leaves the cab to inspect a wagon, travelling for over 50 minutes before being remotely derailed.
 20 November - Spain - A passenger train is derailed by a landslide at Vacarisses. One person is killed and 44 are injured.
 13 December - Turkey - Marşandiz train collision: A high-speed train collides with a pilot locomotive at Ankara, killing nine people and injuring 48.
 14 December - Portugal - In Lisbon, a tram derails due to excessive speed in a curve. 28 are injured.
 21 December - Serbia - A train collides with a bus carrying school students in Donje Međurovo, near Niš, cutting it in half. Five people are killed and more than 13 are injured.

2019
 2 January – Denmark – Great Belt Bridge rail accident: A DSB express passenger train is hit by a semi-trailer from a passing cargo train on the western bridge of the Great Belt Fixed Link, killing eight people and injuring 16.
 6 January – United States – A Norfolk Southern freight train carrying hazardous chemicals derails in Jefferson County, Georgia near Bartow, prompting the evacuation of all addresses within a  radius of the crash site due to tanker leakage. No injuries from the derailment were reported; however, at least 26 people, including a firefighter and three law enforcement officers, were treated for chemical exposure.
 8 January – South Africa – Mountain View train collision: Two passenger trains collide at Mountain View station in Pretoria, killing at least four people and injuring at least 620 others.
 10 January - Nigeria - 3 train cars of a train derails. Several people were injured.
 22 January – Canada – A 52-car Canadian National grain train derails outside Saskatoon. The derailment causes several cars and a DPU locomotive to go off the rails, and causes the DPU locomotive, IC 2699 (a GE C44-9W), to catch fire.
 25 January - United States -  A Union Pacific train collided into a School Bus in Athens, Texas. 1 person was killed and another person was injured.
 26 January – Romania – A CAF metro unit of the Metrorex fails to stop inside a depot and overshoots the buffers, crashing inside the Berceni depot, leaving 2 carriages damaged. The train was supposed to be stabled outside the depot, but due to icy conditions, it was decided to shunt it into the depot halls. The train, accompanied by a shunter locomotive, ran away due to a software failure, and did not stop on time when entering the service platforms. Due to the difficulty of removing the brand-new set, it is likely that the carriages damaged in the accident will be scrapped on site.
 3 February – India – Seemanchal Express derailment: the Seemanchal Express train derails near Sahdei Buzurg in Vaishali district of Bihar, resulting in the deaths of at least 6 passengers.
 4 February – Canada – A westbound Canadian Pacific train derails east of Field, British Columbia, resulting in the deaths of 3 crewmembers.
 8 February – Spain – Two passenger trains collide head-on at Manresa. One person dies, 95 are injured.
 26 February – United States – Two separate Long Island Rail Road trains hit a pickup truck at the School Street railroad crossing in Westbury, New York on the LIRR Main Line, causing the driver and two passengers to be ejected from the vehicle resulting in their deaths, numerous injuries, and damage to the nearby LIRR station platform.
 27 February – Egypt – Ramses Station rail disaster: A train smashes into a barrier inside Ramses Station, causing a major explosion and a fire. More than 25 people die and at least 50 others are injured.
 17 March – DR Congo – A freight train with many passengers on the freight cars derails, leaving 32 dead and around 70 injured.
 18 March – Hong Kong – when the MTR Corporation was conducting a trial run for the new signal system on the Tsuen Wan line, when the two return trains（A131/A218 and A187/A112） drove at the Central Station to the intersection of the two tracks, It was suspected that the signal was out of order and the ATS system on the train did not activate. Both trains failed to reach the brakes and caused an accident. Fortunately, there were no passengers on the train.
 9 April – United States – Several cars of a Delaware-Lackawanna Railroad train derail in Dickson City, Pennsylvania. The derailment occurs within feet of the city's acting police chief while he was in his police car.
 16 April – United States – Six cars of a Norfolk Southern freight train carrying trash derail in Wyomissing, Pennsylvania. The train was traveling westbound from Oak Island, New Jersey to Mingo Junction, Ohio. The derailment backs up train traffic as far away as Chicago.
 19 May – Philippines – An unpowered Manila Light Rail Transit System Line 2 train parked on a pocket track fouls the eastbound track of the main line and collides head-on to a loaded train. The operator of the loaded train was already notified to stop prior to the collision. The operator of the unpowered train jumps onto the tracks. The collision injures 30 passengers and 4 staff.
 28 May – United States – A CSX train derails in Wellington, Ohio, causing a diesel fuel spill and the destruction of 22 cars. No injuries or deaths are reported.
 6 June – United States – A Norfolk Southern train strikes a car allegedly abandoned by a drunk driver and derails in Swanton, Ohio. The derailment causes a power outage and damage to several homeowners' backyards. The driver, Logan Guess, is later found and arrested, and is declared guilty of interfering with the operation of a train and operating a vehicle while impaired, and sentenced to two years' probation.
 24 June – Bangladesh – a passenger train derails at Moulvibazar; at least four people die, more than 200 are injured.
 3 July – United Kingdom – Two track workers killed after being hit by a GWR Express near Port Talbot in South Wales. Both were working on the track in question wearing ear defenders and didn't hear the warnings from the lookout.
 28 July - United States - In University Park, Illinois, a Amtrak Train crashed into a truck and derailed, the truck stalled at a railroad crossing and 5 train cars derailed, 1 person was killed and 2 were injured.
 17 August – United States – About 140 cars from two BNSF Railway trains derail near Walton, Kansas due to high winds from a storm.
 23 August - United States - In Sacramento, California, a Sacramento Regional Transit train crashed into another trains near a Golf Course, 16 people were injured.
 12 September – Democratic Republic of the Congo – A passenger train derails in Tanganyika Province, more than 50 people die.
 31 October – Pakistan – 2019 Tezgam train fire: a fire on a passenger train near Rahim Yar Khan kills at least 64 people and injures 30 more.
 8 November – United States – A Norfolk Southern freight train carrying empty oil tankers rear-ends another freight train carrying intermodal containers in Hempfield Township, Westmoreland County, Pennsylvania, causing cars to derail and strike a third train carrying intermodal containers on an adjacent track, which caused additional cars to derail along that train. The incident shuts down freight traffic along the line and cancels Amtrak's Pennsylvanian train between Pittsburgh and Harrisburg.
 12 November – Bangladesh – Mondobhag train collision: Two passenger trains collide head-on at Kasba; at least sixteen people die, and 100 are injured.
 12 November – India – two passenger trains collide head-on at Hyderabad. Twelve passengers are injured.
 10 December – Botswana – A Botswana Railways train derails. Two crewmembers die.

References 

Rail accidents 2010-2019
21st-century railway accidents
2010s in rail transport
Rail accidents